Samuel Morris Davies (1879–1963) was a Welsh Anglican priest, most notably Archdeacon of Monmouth from 1940 until 1954.

Davies was educated at Sidney Sussex College, Cambridge and Wells Theological College. He was ordained deacon in 1902; and priest in 1903. He was Curate of Corsham from 1903 to 1910; and Chaplain to Lord Islington from 1910 to 1912. On his return from New Zealand he held incumbencies at Machen, Rogiet, Rumney and Penhow.

He is buried at Tal-y-bont Public Cemetery.

References

20th-century Welsh Anglican priests
Alumni of Sidney Sussex College, Cambridge
People educated at Llandovery College
Archdeacons of Monmouth
1963 deaths
1879 births